Dédougou is a department or commune of Mouhoun Province in western Burkina Faso. Its capital is the town of Dédougou. According to the 2019 census the department has a total population of 123,934.

Towns and villages
 Dédougou	(63,617 inhabitants) (capital)
 Bana	(319 inhabitants)
 Bokuy	(729 inhabitants)
 Boron	(624 inhabitants)
 Dankuy	(369 inhabitants)
 Debe	(259 inhabitants)
 Fakouna	(3,647 inhabitants)
 Haperekuy	(97 inhabitants)
 Kamandena	(1,171 inhabitants)
 Kari	(1,568 inhabitants)
 Karo	(3,266 inhabitants)
 Koran	(801 inhabitants)
 Kore	(1,658 inhabitants)
 Koukatenga	(1,556 inhabitants)
 Kouna	(131 inhabitants)
 Konandia	(1,337 inhabitants)
 Lonkakuy	(489 inhabitants)
 Magnimasso	(1,192 inhabitants)
 Makuy	(215 inhabitants)
 Massala	(1,839 inhabitants)
 Naokuy	(960 inhabitants)
 Oulani	(2,997 inhabitants)
 Parade	(1,289 inhabitants)
 Passakongo	(2,894 inhabitants)
 Sagala	(452 inhabitants)
 Soakuy	(173 inhabitants)
 Sokoura	(1,409 inhabitants)
 Soukuy	(864 inhabitants)
 Souri, Burkina Faso	(3,571 inhabitants)
 Tare	(276 inhabitants)
 Tiankuy	(443 inhabitants)
 Toroba	(3,705 inhabitants)
 Wetina	(465 inhabitants)
 Worokuy	(853 inhabitants)
 Yonkuy	(598 inhabitants)
 Zakuy	(231 inhabitants)
 Zeoula	(449 inhabitants)
 Zeoule	(298 inhabitants)

References

Departments of Burkina Faso
Mouhoun Province